A partial solar eclipse occurred on December 24, 1992. A solar eclipse occurs when the Moon passes between Earth and the Sun, thereby totally or partly obscuring the image of the Sun for a viewer on Earth. A partial solar eclipse occurs in the polar regions of the Earth when the center of the Moon's shadow misses the Earth.

Images

Related eclipses

Eclipses of 1992 
 An annular solar eclipse (ascending node) on January 4.
 A partial lunar eclipse (ascending node) on June 15.
 A total solar eclipse (descending node) on June 30.
 A total lunar eclipse (descending node) on December 9.
 A partial solar eclipse (ascending node) on December 24.

Solar eclipses of 1990–1992

Metonic series

References

External links 

1992 12 24
1992 in science
1992 12 24
December 1992 events